Composition No. 173 (subtitled For 4 Actors, 14 Instrumentalists Constructed Environment and Video Projections) is an album by American saxophonist and composer Anthony Braxton with orchestra and actors recorded in 1994 for the Italian Black Saint label.

Reception
The AllMusic review by "Blue" Gene Tyranny stated "This musically and textually complex composition examines movement-strategies that occur in normal life in various spaces ... The music is exciting and contrapuntally dense, and at other times mysteriously sustained. Maps of geography (sounds moving about the real and imaginary and video "virtual" lands) and musical graph strategies are treated as analogs. A thoughtful and innovative "multimedia" work".

Track listing
All compositions by Anthony Braxton.

 "Composition No. 173": 
 "Opening Music – Introduction" – 15:39
 Scene One – Interlude Duo"" – 16:16
 "Scene Two (A) – Interlude Ensemble" – 14:22
 "Scene Two (B)" – 5:12
 "Closing Music" – 7:26

Personnel
Anthony Braxton – conductor
Actors
Steve Ben Israel – "Arnold"
Laura Arbuckle – "Jeremy"
Isha Beck – "Miss Tisingham"
Baba Ben Israel – "Molly"

Musicians
Melinda Newman – oboe; soloist
Brandon Evans – sopranino saxophone, bass clarinet; soloist
Bo Bell – bassoon
Jennifer Hill – clarinet
Danielle Langston, Nickie Braxton – violin
Brett W. Larner – koto
Kevin O'Neil – guitar
Sandra Miller, Jacob Rosen – cello
Dirck Westervelt, Joe Fonda – bass
Josh Rosenblatt – percussion

References

Black Saint/Soul Note albums
Anthony Braxton albums
1996 albums